Alan or Allan Smith may refer to:

Sport

Association football 
Alan Smith (footballer, born 1921) (1921–2019), English football left winger
Alan Smith (footballer, born 1939) (1939–2016), English footballer for Torquay United
Alan Smith (footballer, born 1949), Welsh footballer for Newport County
Alan Smith (footballer, born 1962), English footballer for Leicester City and Arsenal, current pundit
Alan Smith (footballer, born 1966), English footballer for Darlington
Alan Smith (footballer, born 1980), English footballer for Leeds United and Manchester United
Alan Smith (football manager) (born 1946), English former manager of Crystal Palace
Alan Smith (physiotherapist) (born 1950), former England and Sheffield Wednesday physio
Allan Smith (New Zealand footballer), New Zealand international football (soccer) player

Rugby
Alan Smith (rugby union) (born 1942), New Zealand rugby union player

Rugby league
Alan Smith (rugby league, born 1944), English rugby league footballer of the 1960s and 1970s
Alan Smith (rugby league, born 1955), Australian rugby league footballer

Other sports 
Alan Smith (cricketer) (born 1936), English cricketer
Alan Smith (sport shooter) (born 1958), Australian sports shooter
Alan Smith (sailor) (born 1964), New Zealand sailor
Allan Smith (diver) (born 1929), Sri Lankan diver
Allan Smith (high jumper) (born 1992), British athlete

Other fields
Allan Smith (solicitor) (1871–1941), British Conservative Party politician, MP for Croydon South 1919–1923
Allan F. Smith (1911–1994), American professor of law at the University of Michigan
Alan Smith (geneticist) (born 1945), British geneticist
Alan Jay Smith (born 1951), American computer scientist
Alan J. Smith (architect) (born 1949), English architect
Alan Smith (radio presenter) (born 1966), British journalist
Alan Smith (bishop) (born 1957), British bishop of St Albans
Alan Smith (RAF officer) (1917–2013), English Second World War fighter ace
Cris Alexander (born Alan Smith, 1920–2012), American actor and photographer
Sam Smith (toy-maker) (1908–1983), artist, sculptor and toymaker

See also
Al Smith (disambiguation)
Allen Smith (disambiguation)
Alan Smithee, pseudonym used since 1968 by film directors who wished to be dissociated from a film
Alan Smythe, fictional character in BBC 2000–2005 series Monarch of the Glen